Winter Wonderland is the eleventh album by Contemporary Christian group Point of Grace and their second Christmas album, after 1999's A Christmas Story. It was released in 2005 by Word Records.

Track listing
 "It's the Most Wonderful Time of the Year" (Edward Pola; George Wyle) - 2:52
 "Winter Wonderland" (Dick Smith; Felix Bernard) - 3:14
 "Let There Be Light" featuring John David Webster (Marie Reynolds; Scott Krippayne) - 4:42
 "Jingle Bells" (James Lord Pierpont) - 5:10
 "Breath of Heaven (Mary's Song)" (Amy Grant; Chris Eaton) - 5:41
 "In the First Light" (Robert John Kauflin) - 3:34
 "Santa Medley" (Gene Autry; Johnny Marks; Oakley Haldeman; Steve Nelson; Walter Rollins) - 5:01
"Here Comes Santa Claus" (Gene Autry and Oakley Haldeman)
"Frosty the Snowman" (Jack Rollins and Steve Nelson)
"Rudolph, the Red-Nosed Reindeer" (Johnny Marks)
 "Little Town" (Phillips Brooks; Lewis H. Redner; Chris Eaton) - 4:06
 "For Unto Us" (George Frederick Handel) - 4:48
 "All Is Well" featuring Michael W. Smith (Michael W. Smith; Wayne Kirkpatrick) - 4:21

Personnel 

Point of Grace
 Shelley Breen – vocals 
 Heather Payne – vocals 
 Denise Jones – vocals
 Leigh Cappillino – vocals

Musicians
 Shane Keister – acoustic piano (1-5, 7, 8)
 Blair Masters – keyboards (1, 3, 5, 7, 8)
 Michael J. Nelson – synthesizer intro (3)
 Michael W. Smith – acoustic piano (10)
 Tom Bukovac – electric guitar (1, 3, 5, 7, 8)
 Jerry Kimbrough – acoustic guitar (1, 3, 8), guitars (2, 4), electric guitar (3)
 George Cocchini – electric guitar (3)
 David Hungate – bass (1-5, 7, 8), archtop guitar (7)
 Dan Needham – drums (1, 3, 5, 7, 8)
 Paul Leim – drums (2, 4)
 Eric Darken – percussion (2, 4)
 Mark Douthit – saxophones (2, 4)
 Barry Green – trombone (2, 4)
 Mike Haynes – trumpet (2, 4)
 Lee Levine – bass clarinet (4), clarinet (4)
 Sam Levine – flute (4)
 Carl Marsh – orchestra arrangements and conductor (1, 3, 7-10), vocal arrangements (2, 4), boys choir arrangements (5, 9)
 Gavyn Wright – concertmaster (1, 3, 5, 7-10)
 The London Session Orchestra – orchestra (1, 3, 5, 7-10)
 Michael Mellett – vocal arrangements (1, 3, 5, 7, 8, 9)
 Tim Davis – vocal arrangements (6)
 John David Webster – vocals (3)
 The Philadelphia Boys Choir – choir (5, 9)
 Jeffrey Smith – choir director (5, 9)

Production 
 Michael Blanton – executive producer
 Brown Bannister – producer 
 Tim Davis – vocal producer (2, 4)
 Steve Bishir – recording (tracks, overdubs, strings), mixing 
 Andrew Dudman – assistant string engineer 
 Aaron Sternke – digital editing 
 Ted Jensen – mastering at Sterling Sound (New York, NY)
 Burton Brooks – A&R administration
 Traci Sterling Bishir – production coordinator 
 Katherine Petillo – art direction
 Sally Carnes Gulde– design 
 Aaron Rapoport – photography 
 Blair Burle – senior creative administrator 
 David Kaufman – wardrobe 
 Josh Grimes – hair stylist 
 Tobie Orr – make-up
 Lori Casteel – music preparation 
 Mike Casteel – music preparation
 Stephen Lamb – music preparation 
 Eberhard Ramm – music preparation

References

Point of Grace albums
2005 Christmas albums
Christmas albums by American artists